Çorovodë is a town and a former municipality in Berat County, Albania. At the 2015 local government reform it became a subdivision and the seat of the municipality Skrapar. The population at the 2011 census was 4,051. The name of the town derives from the Bulgarian word for "black water". It was the seat of the former Skrapar District.

The river Osum passes through the city. Upstream it forms canyons and caves. The river provides opportunities for kayaking and other aquatic sport.

History
The smaller Çorovoda River also flows through the city and mouths into the Osum river. Five km northeast of Çorovodë it formed the Gradec Canyon. In one of its cliffs the presumably biggest cave of Albania named "Pirogosh" is located. Allegedly, two kings, Piro and Goshi, named it. Also of note is the Ottoman-era Kasabashi stone bridge over the Çorovoda river.

During the period of communist rule in Albania, the town was a closed city that had a military airport, as well as other critical war infrastructure.

Tourism

Çorovodë is known for activities like rafting and mountain hiking. The Osum river is a river that pass between canyons that makes rafting hard and hosts annual rafting contests and championships.  There are many mountains and hikes in the area.
Bogova Reserve
Osum Canyon
Pirogoshi Cave

Notable people
Xhelal bej Koprencka, modern Albania's founding father
Ilir Meta (born 1969), Albanian President

See also
Pirogoshi Cave
Osum Canyon

References

Former municipalities in Berat County
Administrative units of Skrapar
Towns in Albania
Populated places disestablished in 2015